Acyperas rubrella is a species of snout moth in the genus Acyperas. It was described by George Hampson in 1901 and is known from Indonesia (Java and Sumatra).

References

Moths described in 1901
Tirathabini
Moths of Indonesia
Taxa named by George Hampson